The Labourist Movement Party (EHP) is a Marxist–Leninist communist party  in Turkey.

The Labourist Movement Party is one of the components in the United June Movement, a political coalition initiative which was founded after Gezi Park revolt. In 2022, EHP became a part of the Labour and Freedom Alliance to take part in the upcoming general elections in Turkey.

References

External links

2004 establishments in Turkey
Communist parties in Turkey
Far-left politics in Turkey
Labour parties
Political parties established in 2004